Chang-Jin Lee is a Korean-American visual artist who lives in New York City.

Early life 
Lee was born in Seoul, South Korea.

Education 
Lee attended Parsons School of Design and earned her BFA from the State University of New York at Purchase.

Career 
Lee's sculptural art Floating Echo, a transparent inflatable Buddha atop a lotus flower, debuted at the Busan Sea Art Festival in Korea in 2011. The 10-foot-high work was presented at the Socrates Sculpture Park in Queens in 2012 and at the Three River Arts Festival at Point State Park in Pittsburgh the following year.

Lee began researching comfort women in 2007. She traveled to seven Asian countries and interviewed survivors of sexual slavery during World War II as well as a former Imperial Japanese Army soldier. She created a film documentary of the subjects recalling their experiences during the war and their aspirations. Her exhibition Comfort Women Wanted opened at South Korea's Incheon Women Artists' Biennale in 2009. The exhibition's title echoes newspaper advertisements soliciting comfort women during World War II.  The exhibition recreates a comfort station. It was later exhibited in Bonn, Boston, Hong Kong, Pittsburgh, and Taipei. Public art billboards from the exhibition were selected for the New York City Department of Transportation's Urban Art Program in 2013.

Personal life 
Lee lives in New York City.

References

External links
Official website

Living people
Artists from Seoul
American artists of Korean descent
American people of South Korean descent
American people of Korean descent
Parsons School of Design alumni
State University of New York at Purchase alumni
Year of birth missing (living people)